Parava is a commune in Bacău County, Western Moldavia, Romania. It is composed of four villages: Drăgușani, Parava, Rădoaia and Teiuș.

At the 2002 census, 79.5% of inhabitants were ethnic Romanians and 20.4% Roma. 98.4% were Romanian Orthodox and 1.2% Seventh-day Adventist.

References

Communes in Bacău County
Localities in Western Moldavia